Harold G.A. Krieger (October 3, 1926 – April 22, 1995) was an American lawyer, judge, and politician.

Krieger was born in New Ulm, Minnesota. He served in the United States Navy during World War II. Kriger received in bachelor's degree from Macalester College and his law degree from the St. Paul College of Law. Krieger lived in Rochester, Minnesota with his wife and family and practiced law. Krieger served in the Minnesota Senate from 1963 until 1974 and was a Republican. He then served as a Minnesota District Court judge from 1975 until his death in 1995. Krieger died from cancer at his home in Rochester, Minnesota.

Notes

External links

1926 births
1995 deaths
People from New Ulm, Minnesota
Politicians from Rochester, Minnesota
Military personnel from Minnesota
Macalester College alumni
William Mitchell College of Law alumni
Minnesota lawyers
Minnesota state court judges
Republican Party Minnesota state senators
Deaths from cancer in Minnesota
20th-century American politicians
20th-century American judges
20th-century American lawyers